Ham Common is an area of common land in Ham, London. It is a conservation area in, and managed by, the London Borough of Richmond upon Thames. It comprises , the second largest area of common land in the borough,  smaller than Barnes Common. It is divided into two distinct habitats, grassland and woodland, separated by the A307, Upper Ham Road. It is an area of ecological, historical and recreational interest, designated a Local Nature Reserve.

Description
There is a village pond near the western corner which attracts water fowl and other wildlife in the western section.

Ham Common Woods
The B352 road, Ham Gate Avenue, crosses this area, linking the A307 to Richmond Park at Ham Gate. The Latchmere Stream, now culverted for most of its course, has its outfall in a pond near Ham Gate in Ham Common Woods. Two cedar trees were planted to mark King George V's coronation in 1911.

Since the cessation of grazing in the 1930s, the eastern section has transitioned from acid grassland heath with gorse, bracken and bramble, to mixed oak woodland. Pioneer birch, now dying back, is giving way to holly, yew and oak. The thick under-storey of this habitat contrasts with the open, deer-grazed woodland in adjacent Richmond Park to the east and the mown grasslands of the western section and Richmond Golf Club in Sudbrook Park to the north. The local authority and volunteer groups manage the habitat, keeping paths and bridleways clear and removing invasive species such as Snowberry. The remaining open area of sandy, acid grassland has a noted colony of the Ashy mining bee and other solitary bees.

Parts of Church Road, Ham Common are closed to traffic in spring to protect migrating toads to cross safely. New ponds were constructed in early 2017 by Froglife and Richmond Council to provide a habitat for the Common Toad.

History
The map drawn up for Charles I by Nicholas Lane prior to the enclosure of Richmond Park in 1637 shows that the common land of Ham extended from its current area eastwards as far as Beverley Plains and Beverley Brook and the boundary with Roehampton. The northern part of Ham Common in this area was continuous with Petersham Common, which, in turn linked to the smaller Richmond and Mortlake commons. Of the total  enclosed by the park,  fell within Ham's boundaries and, of that,  was common land, the rest being agricultural land in private ownership or already owned by the crown. Charles I paid compensation to the commoners of Ham for their loss and granted them a deed of gift of the remaining unenclosed common land for all time. The enclosure of the Park was one of several of Charles' unpopular acts that contributed to the unrest leading to the Civil War. About ten years later, Cromwell's Army camped on Ham Common 18 November 1647, after the Putney Debates.

Apart from area of the present day Common, other common land existed around the enclosed farm land of Ham. Commoners also enjoyed lammas rights on large areas of enclosed farmland adjoining the river.

Ownership of the common land lay with the lord of the Manor and, from the mid-17th century to the early 20th century, this was held by the Earl of Dysart and the Tollemache family. The management of Ham Common, as with most commons, moved from the manorial courts to a locally appointed vestry. The vestry records reveal typical recurring issues such as encroachment from adjacent land-owners, squatters (who might subsequently gain right of residence and add to the burden on the parish), camping travellers, gipsies, and tinkers, over-grazing, nuisance of geese, pigs rooting and blocking drains, turf damage from exercising horses and grazing of animals by non-local owners including, on one occasion, a flock of 200 sheep from Kingston! The common was protected by gates to prevent animals straying off. Gate houses were located near each corner of the western section of common, one on Ham Street by what is now St Thomas Aquinas Church, Ham, and two on the Upper Ham Road, to the north by the New Inn and one to the south of the common. The latter still stands, 'erected by the inhabitants of Ham and Hatch, 1771' as an almshouse, 'restored by the Hon. Mrs Algernon Tollemache, 1892', and again in 1968.

The defence of Ham Common
By the late Victorian period the increasing pressures for development on Ham Common caused by the rapid expansion of building in and around London were typical of those facing commons across the metropolis. The Metropolitan Commons Acts 1866 to 1878 were passed to help preserve them.

Lord Dysart and the Dysart Trustees sought to exploit the agricultural land of Ham and in particular the lammas land. In 1891 the Dysarts erected notices on the common warning that those removing "gravel, turf, etc without having obtained the license of the Lords of the Manor" would be liable for prosecution. They also erected notices on the lammas lands, affirming that 'trespassers will be prosecuted with the utmost rigour of the law'.

The villagers of Ham contested these actions, claiming that the Dysarts removal of gravel from the common for use at Ham House was outside the manorial right, as Ham House itself lay within the manor of Petersham. The boards also sought to restrict the rights of the commoners and four men were arrested having sawn down four of the six offending boards. Their defence was led by William Harry Harland, a journalist with the Surrey Comet, and the men were acquitted, despite the prosecution being led by no less than the Solicitor General, Sir Edward Clarke QC.

The bill was defeated by 262 votes to 118 as it was deemed to contravene the Metropolitan Commons Acts.

In December 1896, a local enquiry was established with the Board of Agriculture to consider a scheme for the lammas lands under the Metropolitan Commons Acts. The Board determined that the provisions of the acts did not apply in this case.

The Metropolitan Commons (Ham) Supplemental Act 1901 established a Board of Conservators to manage Ham Common.

Public ownership
A few years later, the Private Bill, the Richmond Hill (Preservation of View) Bill, passed through the committee stage. The latter bill contained the same proposals but more concessions than its predecessor and focused more on the preservation of the view from Richmond Hill from urban development. 

The bill was challenged, unsuccessfully, in the House of Commons with votes divided 179 in favour to 79 against. The Richmond, Petersham and Ham Open Spaces Act gained Royal Assent on 18 November 1902.

The act transferred the Dysarts' residual manorial interests in Ham Common and vested them in Ham Urban District Council. The Board of Conservators, established the preceding year, was dissolved in favour of Ham Urban District as well. The Dysart Trustees also gave £3000 to be invested for the upkeep of the common and any residual money to go to almhouses or other local charitable purposes. Whilst the act achieved its objectives, part of the inclusive settlement with the Dysart Trustees extinguished the remaining lammas rights in Ham, thereby liberating the agricultural land for development. The arrangement was not without critics. Henry Labouchère observed that Lord Dysart "... would get possession of 176 acres of lammas land and secure valuable building rights, notwithstanding that Parliament had decided that no common lands within a radius of fifteen miles of London should be built upon."

The Metropolitan Commons (Ham) Supplemental Act 1901 mistakenly depicted a section of the grounds of Wilmer House as being part of the common. This error was rectified over fifty years later in the Metropolitan Common Scheme (Ham) Amending Scheme Confirmation Act, 1954.

Notable buildings
There are many notable buildings around the periphery of Ham Common. Clockwise from the north these include; Sudbrook Lodge and Cottages, Ormeley Lodge, and, next to Ham Gate, Park Gate Lodge. The neighbouring Grade II listed lodge, just inside Richmond Park, dates from 1742.

Latchmere House the wartime Camp 020, Wilmer House, and St Andrew's Church, Ham are located on Church Road around Ham Common Woods. On the A307 Upper Ham Road lie Fox House, Ivy Cottage, Ivy House and Ivy House Cottage, a few doors away from the Hand and Flower which dates from 1861 but the present building is more recent.

Along Ham Street, the approach to the River Thames, lies the Cassel Hospital, dating from the 18th century. Next to it lies Langham House and, behind it, in its former garden, the 1958-built, Grade II* listed Langham House Close designed by James Stirling and James Gowan. Gordon House, The Little House and Ensleigh Lodge further along are all grade II listed.

St Thomas Aquinas Church, Ham, formerly the parish National school, marks the north west corner of the common and, behind it, Selby House. To the west and north of the church lie The Malt House and Ham Brewery Tap, both vestiges of a 19th-century brewery. Further along the northern boundary lie the picturesque gate-houses flanking Ham House avenue, Avenue Cottage and Avenue Lodge Cottage and Avenue Lodge itself. To their east are St Michael's Convent and The Cottage, Hardwicke House, South Lodge and the New Inn built 1756 as a replacement for the White Hart, an inn that dated from at least 1675. The adjacent Stafford Cottages are believed to be the oldest on the common, dating from the beginning of the 16th century.

Recreation
Ham Common is a popular local recreational amenity. A horse track crosses the common, linking Richmond Park to the river via the avenue to Ham House. Ham and Petersham Cricket Club play regularly on the common during the season.

Since 1984, the local Ham Amenities Group have organised an annual village fair, usually on the second Saturday of June, in aid of local charities. Travelling fairs and other ad-hoc recreational events also use the common.

References

Bibliography

External links

Defra 'Magic' land use website
 London Borough of Richmond upon Thames: Ham Common 
 Photos of Ham Common with brief descriptions at Ham Photos blog
 Photos of Ham Common Woods with brief descriptions at Ham Photos blog

Common land in London
Forests and woodlands of London
Ham, London
Local nature reserves in Greater London
Parks and open spaces in the London Borough of Richmond upon Thames